The Burlington Public School District RE-6J is a public school district in Kit Carson County, Colorado, United States, based in Burlington, Colorado.

Schools
Burlington Public School District RE-6J has two elementary schools, one middle school and one high school.

Elementary schools
Burlington Elementary School

Middle schools
 Burlington Middle School

High school
Burlington High School

References

External links

School districts in Colorado
Kit Carson County, Colorado